Arguel is the name of the following communes in France:

 Arguel, Doubs, in the Doubs department
 Arguel, Somme, in the Somme department